Lepotrema amansis is a species of lepocreadiid digenean parasitic in the intestine of marine fish. It was described in 2018.

Hosts and localities

The broom filefish, Amanses scopas (Tetraodontiformes: Monacanthidae) is the type-host of Lepotrema amansis. The type-locality is off Heron Island, Great Barrier Reef, Australia.

References 

Plagiorchiida
Animals described in 2018
Platyhelminthes of Australia
Parasites of fish